The 2018–19 Stony Brook Seawolves women's basketball team represented Stony Brook University during the 2018–19 NCAA Division I women's basketball season. The Seawolves, led by fifth-year head coach Caroline McCombs, play their home games at the Island Federal Credit Union Arena and were members in the America East Conference. They finished the season 23–8, 11–5 in America East play to finish in third place. They defeated Vermont in the quarterfinals before losing to Hartford in the semifinals of the America East women's tournament.

Media 
All non-televised home games and conference road games will stream on either ESPN3 or AmericaEast.tv. Most road games will stream on the opponents website. All games will have an audio broadcast streamed online through the Pack Network.

Roster

Schedule 

|-
!colspan=9 style=| Non-conference regular season

|-
!colspan=9 style=| American East regular season

|-
!colspan=9 style=| America East Women's Tournament

See also 

 2018–19 Stony Brook Seawolves men's basketball team

References 

Stony Brook Seawolves women's basketball seasons
Stony Brook Seawolves women's basketball team
Stony Brook Seawolves women's basketball team
Stony Brook Seawolves women's basketball team